Kingston–Ulster Airport  is a privately owned, public use airport located four nautical miles (5 mi, 7 km) north of the central business district of Kingston, a city in Ulster County, New York, United States. The airport is situated near East Kingston, in the Town of Ulster. This airport is included in the National Plan of Integrated Airport Systems for 2011–2015, which categorized it as a general aviation airport.

Facilities and aircraft 
Kingston–Ulster Airport covers an area of 87 acres (35 ha) at an elevation of 147.4 ft. / 44.9 m (surveyed) above mean sea level. Runway 15/33 is the sole landing surface on the field.  It has an asphalt surface measuring 3,100 by 60 feet (945 x 18 m).

For the 12-month period ending August 29, 2013, the airport had 8,000 general aviation aircraft operations, an average of 21 per day. At that time there were 34 aircraft based at this airport: 94% single-engine and 6% multi-engine.

Richmor Aviation, the fixed-base operator (FBO), offers flight instruction and sightseeing flights around the Hudson Valley. The airport mostly serves Ulster County.

Aviation

References

External links 
 http://www.richmorflightschool.com/ ,the fixed-base operator (FBO)
 Kingston-Ulster Airport (20N) at NYSDOT Airport Directory
 Aerial image as of March 1995 from USGS The National Map
 
 

Airports in New York (state)
Airports established in 1961
1961 establishments in New York (state)
Transportation_buildings_and_structures_in_Ulster_County,_New_York